The R803 road is a regional road in Dublin, Ireland.

The official definition of the R803 from the Roads Act 1993 (Classification of Regional Roads) Order 2012  states:

R803: Summerhill - Parnell Street, Dublin

Between its junction with R105 at Annesley Bridge Road and its junction with R804 at Bolton Street via Fairview Strand, Ballybough Road, Summerhill Parade, Summerhill, Parnell Street, Ryders Row and Capel Street all in the city of Dublin.</p>

See also
Roads in Ireland
Regional road

References

Regional roads in the Republic of Ireland
Roads in County Dublin